Siobhan Maher (born 11 January 1964) is an English singer and songwriter. She was the lead vocalist of the Liverpool-based band River City People during the late 1980s and early 1990s. The band released two albums, Say Something Good and This Is the World.

She is the daughter of Liverpool entertainer and BBC Radio Merseyside presenter Billy Maher.

Musical career
In the 1980s, prior to joining River City People, Maher had been a vocalist with the local bands Passion Polka, Peep Show (with future RCP bassist Dave Snell, to whom she was briefly married) and The Persuaders (with future RCP drummer and co-founder Paul Speed).

After River City People split, Maher teamed with the rave act Oceanic for the single "Ignorance" after their regular singer Jorinde Williams lost her voice. "Ignorance" charted at number 72 on the Official UK Singles chart in November 1992 and would be Maher Kennedy's only solo credited hit on the Official Charts database.

A couple of years later she formed a duo with Debbi Peterson, drummer and vocalist with The Bangles, called Kindred Spirit, who released a self-titled album in 1995. Although Peterson and Maher never officially split, Kindred Spirit is inactive. Peterson returned to the Bangles, and Maher released a solo album in 2002 titled Immigrant Flower.

Living in Nashville, Tennessee having married Ray Kennedy, producer of Steve Earle and Malcolm Holcombe, the country/folk/Americana influence on her music is noticeable. She now styles herself Siobhan Maher Kennedy.

On 29 May 2022, her single "God Bless The World" would be a new entry in the Top 40 of Mike Read's Heritage Chart at number 32.

Other work
In 1987, Maher played the part of Lettuce in the Brookside spin-off series Damon and Debbie. Maher also made forays into television presenting, on the 1987 series of the BBC1 fashion magazine programme The Clothes Show and the 1987 and 1988 seasons of But First This!, Children's BBC's summer holiday morning programme. For the 1987 season she presented a week solo (others doing the same included Andy Crane, Simon Potter, Tracy Brabin and Anthea Turner) and in 1988 presented throughout the run in rotation with other members of the presenting team for that season (Andy Crane, Colin Heywood and Sue Devaney).

Maher sang background vocals on Willy DeVille's 1996 Loup Garou album and the 1997 Joey Tempest album Azalea Place, and duetted with Steve Earle on the song "Poison Lovers" from his 1997 album El Corazón.  Additionally, she has performed backing vocals on several albums by Malcolm Holcombe, including the 2009 release For The Mission Baby.

Maher also sang backing vocals on Manu Katché's album It's About Time, which was recorded at Real World Studios and featured Sting, Peter Gabriel and Pino Palladino amongst others.

The 2002 BBC One comedy-drama Being April featured a theme song performed by Maher—the Richard Thompson-penned "I Want to See the Bright Lights Tonight." Maher appeared in one episode performing the song, which is also featured on her solo album Immigrant Flower.

Inspired by the community of musicians and songwriters in Nashville, Maher Kennedy began a project in Liverpool in 2019 called The Liver Girls to pursue the creation of a similar collective of women singer-songwriters in her former home city.

Discography

Solo recordings
 2002: Immigrant Flower (BMG / Gravity)

With Kindred Spirit
 1995: Kindred Spirit (I.R.S. Records)

With River City People
Albums
 1989: Say Something Good (EMI Records)
 1991 This Is the World (EMI)

Single(s)
 1990: "California Dreaming" (EMI) cover of The Mamas & the Papas, now available with the reissue of the Say Something Good album

References

External links
 
 
 2002 Liverpool Echo interview with Siobhan Maher Kennedy
Siobhan Maher as presenter in 1987 on BBC1's But First This!
Live clip of Siobhan Maher with The Persuaders, Liverpool 1987, accessed 2 April 2009
 What Are We Going To Do, The Persuaders music video featuring Siobhan Maher, accessed 4 April 2013
California Dreaming by River City People in a 1990 appearance on Top of the Pops, accessed 7 November 2021 
 What's Wrong With Dreaming, River City People music video, accessed 5 April 2013
This is the World, River City People live performance, accessed 30 May 2014 
Here in My Eyes, Kindred Spirit music video, accessed 2 April 2009

1964 births
Living people
Musicians from Liverpool
Kennedy, Siobhan Maher